The calcitonin receptor (CT) is a G protein-coupled receptor that binds the peptide hormone calcitonin and is involved in maintenance of calcium homeostasis, particularly with respect to bone formation and metabolism.

CT works by activating the G-proteins Gs and Gq often found on osteoclasts, on cells in the kidney, and on cells in a number of regions of the brain. It may also affect the ovaries in women and the testes in men.

The function of the CT receptor protein is modified through its interaction with Receptor activity-modifying proteins (RAMPs), forming the multimeric amylin receptors AMY1 (CT + RAMP1), AMY2 (CT + RAMP2), and AMY3 (CT+ RAMP3).

Interactions 

Calcitonin receptor has been shown to interact with Apolipoprotein B and LRP1.

References

Further reading

External links 
 
 

G protein-coupled receptors